Harold Marion Osborn D.O. (April 13, 1899 – April 5, 1975) was an American track athlete. He won a gold medal in Olympic decathlon and high jump in 1924 and was the first athlete to win a gold medal in both the decathlon and an individual event.

Life
After high school, Osborn attended the University of Illinois, from 1919 through 1922, majoring in agriculture. Both of Osborns parents were of entirely English ancestry. All of Osborn's ancestors came to North America from England and all of them emigrated to the Province of Massachusetts Bay before the year 1700. Osborn was descended from Richard Sears, John Underhill, Myles Standish, George Soule and John Woodbridge. Osborn won gold medals and set Olympic records in both the high jump and the decathlon at the 1924 Olympics. His 6'6" high jump remained the Olympic record for 12 years, while his decathlon score of 7,710.775 points also set a new world record, and resulted in worldwide press coverage calling him the "world's greatest athlete."

On May 27, 1924, Osborn's 6' 8-¼" high jump set a world record at an AAU meet held at the University of Illinois campus in Urbana. Osborn competed in the Olympics again in 1928. In the high jump, four competitors tied for second place. The initial tying jumps for second place were 6' 3- ½", just an inch behind gold medalist, Bob King, who jumped 6' 4½".

Titles and records
Osborn won 17 national titles and set six world records during his career. He held world indoor records in the standing hop, step, and jump; the 60-yard high hurdles; and the running high jump. His holds the world record in the standing high jump of 5' 5¾" which he achieved at the age of 37. Osborn was enshrined as a charter member of the National Track and Field Hall of Fame in 1974.

High jumping styles
He modified the Western roll technique by developing an efficient side‑to‑the‑bar clearance, which resulted in more height and consistency.

References

Sources
 USA Track and Field website http://www.usatf.org/
 The Complete Book of the Summer Olympics, 1996 Edition, Sports Illustrated.
 Olympic Trials Website http://www.legacy.usatf.org/statistics/OlympicTrialsStats2004.pdf
 The Olympics Fact Book http://www.Rediff.com/
 Article from July 18, 1996 – The Hillsboro Journal, Hillsboro, Illinois
 Obituary – Chicago Tribune, Thursday, April 10, 1975
 Reminiscences of Margaret Bordner Osborn to Marianna Trekell and family members
 Letters written by Harold Osborn to Margaret Bordner in 1925 (copies in possession of author; original letters in possession of Osborn's daughters).
 Trekell, Marianna, and White, Cyril M., unpublished manuscript titled "Harold M. Osborn at the Games of the VIII Olympiad Paris, 1925," written in the 1980s. Trekell was a faculty member in the Dept. of Physical Education at the University of Illinois, Champaign-Urbana. White was a sociologist at University College, Dublin, Ireland, with an academic interest in the Sociology of Sport.
 Article from the Illinois Alumni News, September 1974, titled "Dublin Remembers Harold Osborn '22".
 Hansen, Willard, Champaign-Urbana News-Gazette, Urbana, Illinois, April 25, 1975.
 Sports News, Christian Science Monitor, Boston, May 9, 1944, "Osborn Still Clears 6 Feet Long After Leaving College."
 Murray, Feg, "Crossing the Bar," newspaper clipping dated February 16, 1926, University of Illinois Archives—Harold M. Osborn file. Released through Metropolitan Newspaper Service.
 Letter written by Osborn to Volker Kluge, January 31, 1969, in possession of Osborn's niece, Emily Osborn.

External links 

 

1899 births
1975 deaths
People from Montgomery County, Illinois
Track and field athletes from Illinois
American male decathletes
American male high jumpers
Athletes (track and field) at the 1924 Summer Olympics
Athletes (track and field) at the 1928 Summer Olympics
Olympic gold medalists for the United States in track and field
World record setters in athletics (track and field)
American osteopathic physicians
Illinois Fighting Illini men's track and field athletes
Medalists at the 1924 Summer Olympics
People from Lewistown, Illinois
Olympic decathletes
Philadelphia College of Osteopathic Medicine alumni